Raymond Pointer (10 October 1936 – 26 January 2016) was a professional association footballer and England international who played as a striker.

He had a long and successful playing career, totalling over 400 league appearances whilst playing for Burnley, Bury, Coventry City, Portsmouth and Waterlooville. He won 3 England caps overall whilst at Burnley, scoring 2 goals for his country. He won his first cap on 28 September 1961 in a 4–1 win against Luxembourg. He scored in that match. His other England goal was against Portugal. He died in a nursing home in Blackpool, Lancashire, in 2016.

Honours
 Burnley
 Football League First Division champions: 1959–60
 FA Cup runner-up: 1962

References

External links
 

English footballers
1936 births
Coventry City F.C. players
Bury F.C. players
Burnley F.C. players
Waterlooville F.C. players
Portsmouth F.C. players
Blackpool F.C. non-playing staff
Bury F.C. non-playing staff
England international footballers
England under-23 international footballers
2016 deaths
People from Cramlington
Footballers from Northumberland
English Football League players
English Football League representative players
Association football forwards
FA Cup Final players